Pingla Thana Mahavidyalaya, also known as Pingla College, is an undergraduate, coeducational college situated in Maligram, a gram panchayat in Pingla, Paschim Medinipur, West Bengal. It was established in 1965. The college is affiliated to Vidyasagar University.

Departments

Arts, Science and Commerce (UG)
Bengali
English
Sanskrit
History
Geography
Political Science
Physical Education
Philosophy
Commerce
Mathematics
Botany
Zoology
Physiology
Computer Science
Economics
Sociology

POST GRADUATE COURSES
Bengali
English
History
Commerce

Accreditation
Recently, Pingla Thana Mahavidyalaya has been re-accredited and awarded B++ grade by the National Assessment and Accreditation Council (NAAC). The college is also recognized by the University Grants Commission (UGC).

See also

References

External links
Official Website of Pingla Thana Mahavidyalaya 

Universities and colleges in Paschim Medinipur district
Colleges affiliated to Vidyasagar University
Educational institutions established in 1965
1965 establishments in West Bengal